Canning Vale College is a public co-educational high day school in the City of Gosnells, located in Canning Vale, a suburb of Perth, Western Australia.

History
The school opened in 2004. Initial construction cost A$15 million for the business centre, two-level middle school building, arts centre, and library. At the end of 2005 work commenced on the second stage of building at a cost of an estimated A$20 million. This stage included a two-level senior school building, gymnasium, materials technology centre and hard courts. The school has two main buildings.

Enrolments were restricted to years 8 and 9 in 2004. In 2005 this expanded to include year 10, following the education progression of the initial students. As this group of students progresses so too did the school's enrolments, culminating in year 12 enrolments for 2007. From 2015 the school accepted year 7 students.

The school has  of wetland and bush area, and as part of their curriculum the students work with environmental organisations to maintain, monitor and enhance this area.

Intake Area
Canning Vale College's intake area is specified by the WA Department of Education and Training to include the suburb of Canning Vale and parts of surrounding suburbs. Feeder primary schools are all, or part of, Caladenia Primary School, Campbell Primary School, Canning Vale Primary School, Excelsior Primary School and Raford Primary School.

Its neighbouring high schools are Willetton Senior High School to the north-west, Leeming Senior High School to the west, Atwell College to the south and Southern River College to the east.

See also

 List of schools in the Perth metropolitan area

References

External links

Educational institutions established in 2004
2004 establishments in Australia
Public high schools in Perth, Western Australia
Canning Vale, Western Australia